Miss Sara Sampson (original spelling Miß Sara Sampson) is a play by the Enlightenment philosopher, Gotthold Ephraim Lessing. Written in 1755 while the author was living in Potsdam, it is seen by many scholars to be one of the first bourgeois tragedies. In the same year it was represented at Frankfurt-on-the-Oder and was very well received. It was afterwards translated and acted in France, where it also met with success. The play was Lessing's first real success as a playwright and it was in part due to the success of this play that he was asked to be the dramaturg at the German National Theatre in Hamburg.

See also
Gotthold Ephraim Lessing
Bourgeois tragedy
Age of Enlightenment

Notes

External links
 Miss Sara Sampson, full translation by Ernest Bell online.
 

1755 plays
Plays by Gotthold Ephraim Lessing
Tragedy plays